Jacob Eduard Mantius (18 January 1806 – 4 July 1874) was a German operatic tenor, composer and voice teacher.

Life 
Born in Schwerin, at the request of his father, a factory owner, Mantius began studying law at the University of Rostock in the autumn of 1826. A year later, he broke off his studies and moved to Leipzig to study music. He took singing lessons with Christian August Pohlenz, the then director of the Gewandhausorchester. In 1829, he sang the tenor parts at a concert in Halle (Saale) conducted by Gasparo Spontini, the general music director of the Staatsoper Unter den Linden in Berlin. In the same year he became a member of the Berliner Singakademie, which was conducted by Karl Friedrich Zelter. In 1830, King Frederick William III of Prussia appointed him as a singer at his court opera. He made his debut there with great success as Tamino in Mozart's Magic Flute. His sonorous tenor and his acting talent soon made him famous outside of Berlin.

 Students
 Hermann Thomaschek, Eleonore de Ahna, Paul Bulß, Theodor Reichmann, Amanda Tscherpa

 Further reading 
 
 Ludwig Eisenberg: Eduard Mantius. In Großes biographisches Lexikon der deutschen Bühne im XIX. Jahrhundert''. Paul list, Leipzig 1903,

References

External links 
 
 

German operatic tenors
German composers
Voice teachers
1806 births
1874 deaths
People from Schwerin
19th-century German male opera singers